The 4th Globes de Cristal Award ceremony honoured the best French movies, actors, actresses, plays, concerts, novels, singers, TV series, exhibitions and fashion designers of 2008 and took place on 2 February 2009 at Le Lido in Paris. The ceremony was chaired by Jacques Attali.

Winners and nominees 
The winners are denoted in bold.

Cinema 

 Mesrine – Jean-François Richet
 The Class – Laurent Cantet
 Love Me No More – Jean Becker
 A Christmas Tale – Arnaud Desplechin
 The First Day of the Rest of Your Life – Rémi Bezançon

 Vincent Cassel – Mesrine
 Albert Dupontel – Love Me No More
 Mathieu Amalric – Mesrine
 Roschdy Zem – The Girl from Monaco
 Kad Merad – Bienvenue chez les Ch'tis

 Sylvie Testud – Sagan
 Catherine Deneuve – A Christmas Tale
 Nathalie Baye – A French Gigolo
 Catherine Frot – Mark of an Angel
 Yolande Moreau – Séraphine

Television 

 Sagan – Diane Kurys
 Résolution 819 – Giacomo Battiato
 Plus belle la vie – 
 Mafiosa – Hugues Pagan
 Hard – 

 9/3 Mémoire d'un territoire – Yamina Benguigui

Theater 

 The Life Before Us – 

 Le soldat rose – Louis Chedid & Dominique Burgaug

 Valérie Lemercier – Valérie Lemercier au Palace

 Blanche Neige – Angelin Preljocaj

Literature 

  – Jean-Louis Fournier

 Une vie de chat – Philippe Geluck

Music 

 Anaïs Croze – 

 Julien Doré – Ersatz

Others 

 Picasso et les Maîtres au Grand Palais

 Andrée Putman

 Isabel Marant

Special 

 Roberto Alagna

See also 
 34th César Awards

References

External links 
 Official website
 

2009 film awards
Globes de Cristal
Globes de Cristal Awards